1989 ACC tournament may refer to:

 1989 ACC men's basketball tournament
 1989 ACC women's basketball tournament
 1989 ACC men's soccer tournament
 1989 ACC women's soccer tournament
 1989 Atlantic Coast Conference baseball tournament